This is a list of the governors of the province of Kunar, Afghanistan.

Governors of Kunar Province

See also
 List of current governors of Afghanistan

Notes

Kunar